D. lagunensis may refer to:

 Diaporthe lagunensis, a plant pathogen
 Dyscolus lagunensis, a ground beetle